Der Fürst und das Mädchen is a German drama television series.

See also
List of German television series

External links
 

German drama television series
German television soap operas
2003 German television series debuts
2007 German television series endings
German-language television shows
ZDF original programming